Berthold von Oberg, O.P. (died 1494) was a Roman Catholic prelate who served as Auxiliary Bishop of Mainz (1468–1489).

Biography
Berthold von Oberg was ordained a priest in the Order of Preachers. On 13 May 1468, he was appointed during the papacy of Pope Paul II as Auxiliary Bishop of Mainz and Titular Bishop of Banados. On 26 May 1468, he was consecrated bishop by Antonio, Bishop of Civita Castellana e Orte, with Giacomo, Titular Bishop of Cervicensis, and Antonio Cicco da Pontecorvo, Bishop of Caserta, serving as co-consecrators. He served as Auxiliary Bishop of Mainz until his resignation in 1489. He died on 4 August 1494. While bishop, he was the principal co-consecrator of Berthold von Henneberg-Römhild, Archbishop of Mainz (1485).

References

External links and additional sources
 (for Chronology of Bishops) 
 (for Chronology of Bishops)  

15th-century German Roman Catholic bishops
Bishops appointed by Pope Paul II
1494 deaths
Dominican bishops